is a 2003 Japanese anime film by Madhouse, directed by Kitarō Kōsaka, the famed animation supervisor of the Oscar-winning anime film Spirited Away and Princess Mononoke and long-time collaborator of Studio Ghibli, and adapted from a short 3-tankōbon manga by Iō Kuroda, entitled Nasu, which was serialized in the Afternoon manga magazine.

Kōsaka became interested in adapting the work after his long-time collaborator, Hayao Miyazaki, a fan of cycling, himself recommended the manga to Kōsaka. The film soon went on to become the first Japanese anime film ever to be selected for the Cannes Film Festival.

Nasu: Summer in Andalusia has been translated and dubbed into English by the anime television network Animax, which has broadcast the film in Southeast Asia, the Indian subcontinent, and other regions. It was also translated into French, under the title Nasu – Un été andalou, and Italian, under the title Melanzane – Estate andalusa. The German version was released as Nasu – Sommer in Andalusien.

A sequel, Nasu: A Migratory Bird with Suitcase, set in Japan on the Japan Cup Cycle Road Race, was released in 2007. Directed by Kitarō Kōsaka, it featured Ken'ichi Yoshida, another long-time collaborator of Studio Ghibli, who has worked on several Studio Ghibli films such as Princess Mononoke and Porco Rosso, as animation director. In 2008, Nasu: A Migratory Bird with Suitcase won the best Original Video Animation award at the seventh annual Tokyo Anime Awards, held at the 2008 Tokyo International Anime Fair.

Plot
Nasu: Summer in Andalusia follows the story of a professional Spanish cyclist, Pepe Benengeli, as he competes in the Vuelta a España road bicycle race through his home town in the Iberian region of Andalusia. As the story progresses, Pepe is faced with frustrating consequences, with him facing pressure from his sponsors and the wedding of his former girlfriend, Carmen, to his elder brother, Ángel, coinciding on the same day of the penultimate stage of the bicycle race. Originally is meant to be a backup racer (domestique) whose job is to assist his more prominent teammate to win the race. However he accidentally overhears a conversation in his sponsor's van through his radio com-link which had been negligently left open, in which he finds out, to his shock, that his sponsor intends to fire him after the race. Realizing that he may not find another team for the next season and that he has nothing left to lose, he disregards his instructions and sets out to win the race for himself.

Influences
Some of the teams or riders in the race are influenced by name and/or uniform by actual cycling teams or riders in the early 2000s. Zamenhoff's team Pamei, for example, is named after prominent cycling team Mapei. Bazel's team P-Phone, and its sprint train strategy, is comparable to that of the Telekom team of Erik Zabel, who Bazel is named after. Zabel was one of the most prominent sprinters of all time, winning many stages in the Grand Tours.

Credits
Nasu: Summer in Andalusia was produced by the anime studio, Madhouse, and directed and written by Kitarō Kōsaka, the famed animation supervisor of the Oscar-winning anime film, Spirited Away and Princess Mononoke, and long-time collaborator of Studio Ghibli, and was his theatrical film directorial debut. The music for the film was conducted by Toshiyuki Honda, and its sound was produced by Masafumi Mima. Its directors of photography were Katsuyoshi Kishi and Hisao Shirai, its art director was Naoya Tanaka and its editing was done by Takeshi Seyama. Its producer was Masao Maruyama and its executive producer was Tamotsu Shiina.

Cast
Yo Ōizumi – Pepe
Eiko Koike – Carmen
Hiroaki Hirata – Francisco
Masahiko Tanaka – Ciocci
 – Hernández
Mitsumasa Daigo – Zulbarán
Rintarou Nishi – Pizarro
Seiji Sasaki – Zamenhoff
Toshio Kakei – Ángel
Yuko Kaida – Woman A
 – Gilmore

Staff
Original Work: Iō Kuroda's Nasu
Director, Screenplay, Animation Director: Kitarō Kōsaka
Episode Direction: Atsushi Takahashi
Producer: Masao Maruyama
Ending Theme: Kiyoshirō Imawano
Music: Toshiyuki Honda
Production: Madhouse
Special Assistance: Nihon Jitensha Shinkōkai
Production: Nasu: Summer in Andalusia Production Committee

References

External links
 VAP's official website 
 
 

2003 anime films
Andalusia in fiction
Cycling in anime and manga
Cycling films
2003 directorial debut films
2003 films
Films set in Spain
2000s Japanese-language films
Madhouse (company)
Japanese road movies
2000s road movies
Japanese sports films